Scotch Grove Township is a township in Jones County, Iowa.

History
Scotch Grove Township was organized in 1855. The current population is 446.

References

Populated places in Jones County, Iowa
Townships in Iowa